Amazonia is a 2013 Brazilian-French drama film with animals directed by Thierry Ragobert. It was screened out of competition at the 70th Venice International Film Festival and closed the festival. The main character of the film is Sai (Castanha in the Brazilian version), a capuchin monkey born and raised in captivity. After a plane crash strands him in the Amazon rainforest, he must find his way amongst the beauty and danger that exists within the Amazon.

References

External links
 

2013 films
2013 drama films
Brazilian drama films
French drama films
2010s Portuguese-language films
Brazilian 3D films
French 3D films
2010s French films